= Master of Business Systems =

Master of Business Systems (MBS) is a Postgraduate/Master's degree in Business Systems.

Business Systems programs combine Information Technology (IT) and Business/Management courses and are common in Australia.
